A by-election was held for the New South Wales Legislative Assembly seat of Bass Hill on 2 August 1986. The by-election was triggered by the resignation of sitting Labor MP Neville Wran. It was won by Liberal candidate Michael Owen.

The Bass Hill by-election was held the same day as the Rockdale by-election.

Background
Neville Wran resigned as Premier of New South Wales after more than 10 years in office. At the time, Wran held the record for the longest uninterrupted stint as NSW Premier. In addition to resigning as Premier, Wran also resigned his seat in the Legislative Assembly, necessitating a by-election to fill the vacancy.

Result
Bass Hill was lost by the Labor Party for the only time in the history of the district. In a very close result, Liberal Party candidate Michael Owen won the contest by 103 votes after the distribution of preferences.

Labor MP Neville Wran resigned.

See also
Electoral results for the district of Bass Hill
List of New South Wales state by-elections

Notes

References 

1986 elections in Australia
New South Wales state by-elections
1980s in New South Wales
August 1986 events in Australia